University of the Holy Land is a Christian university in Jerusalem.

History 
The University was founded in 1986 by Dr. Stephen J. Phfann and Dr. Claire Pfann, who are known for their archaeological work on the Dead Sea Scrolls.

References

External links

1986 establishments in Israel
Christian universities and colleges in Israel
Education in Jerusalem
Universities and colleges in Jerusalem